In addition to the usual tasks of a green water navy, the Colombian Navy also performs coast guard duties, has shared responsibility for patrolling the extensive Colombian network of rivers, and includes the Marine Infantry (IM). Furthermore, its littoral/riverine component is relatively large when compared with the more traditional navies of other countries.
Due to this aggregation of duties, some vessels perform routinely and indistinctly as coast guard/combat patrol, particularly those mid-size, lightly armed vessels, and can occasionally be found classified as either Surface combat or Coast Guard or even Logistics/General transport across different sources, even in official documents from the ARC itself. Also, many of the lighter patrol/harbor patrol boats may be assigned or reassigned duties across the different branches with little or no notice depending on service needs.
As the ARC has embarked in a program of modernization since 2000, a better separation and categorization of the different vessels has ensued, with many vessels being re-numbered or reclassified, which makes for occasionally conflicting references. This article tries to use the latest denominations whenever possible, but there may still be overlaps.

Key 

The tables below use the following key:

Oceanic combat

Littoral / Riverine service

Coast Guard

Training, Auxiliary and Logistics

Notes

References 

Ships of the Colombian Navy
Naval ships of Colombia